John Francis Bentley (30 January 1839 – 2 March 1902) was an English ecclesiastical architect whose most famous work is the Westminster Cathedral in London, England, built in a style heavily influenced by Byzantine architecture.

Life

Bentley was born in Doncaster. In 1839, he was associated with the firm of Holland & Hannan. He was an apt modeller and had tried his hand with success at stone carving. He studied under Henry Clutton before branching out on his own in 1868.

His first important commission was from Cardinal Manning, for the seminary at Hammersmith. Examples of his work include Holy Rood Church, Watford, St John's Beaumont School, Corpus Christi Church, Brixton, St Mary's, Cadogan Street, Chelsea (1879), the high altar at St Gabriel's, Warwick Square, and St Luke's Church, Chiddingstone Causeway (1897), and the Sacred Heart Chapel at the Jesuit Church of the Immaculate Conception, Farm Street. Though much of his work was in the neo-Gothic style, he was selected to create a Byzantine Revival design for Westminster Cathedral.

The great opportunity of Bentley's career came in 1894, when he was commissioned to design a new Roman Catholic cathedral in Westminster, London. After deciding on a Byzantine Revival design, Bentley travelled to Italy to study some of the great early Byzantine-influenced cathedrals, such as St Mark's Basilica in Venice. Because of illness and an outbreak of cholera in Istanbul, he was unable to complete his tour with a study of the Hagia Sophia. Bentley ended his tour in Venice and returned to London to begin work on Westminster Cathedral.

George Williamson describes him as a person of brusque, reserved manner, but kind and friendly to those who knew him. He had the strongest dislike to the preparation of show drawings and to the system of architectural competition and, being a man wholly lacking in self-assertion, and reticent in conversation, was never as well known in general circles as he deserved to be. His great characteristics as an architect were his careful attention to detail, his solicitude that all the fittings should be in perfect harmony with the building.

In 1874 he married Margaret Annie Fleuss; they had 4 sons and 7 daughters. Their house in Clapham has a blue plaque.

Bentley was awarded the gold medal of the Institute of Architects in February, 1902, but never received it, as on 1 March he was seized with paralysis and died the following morning in Clapham. He is buried at St Mary Magdalen Church, Mortlake.

Architectural work
 Also St Francis of Assisi London W11

Notes

References

External links
 
 Winefride de L'Hôpital,   Westminster cathedral and its architect  Volume 1 (1919) (This volume is written by Bentley's daughter and is about the design and construction of the Cathedral)
 Winefride de L'Hôpital  Westminster cathedral and its architect (1919) Volume 2 (This is Volume 2 of the biography written by Bentley's daughter and deals with his early life and works other than Westminster Cathedral)

1839 births
1902 deaths
19th-century English architects
People from Doncaster
English ecclesiastical architects
English Roman Catholics
Burials at St Mary Magdalen Roman Catholic Church Mortlake
Architects from Yorkshire